Chuck Carr may refer to:

 Charles L. Carr Jr., National Commander, Civil Air Patrol
 Chuck Carr (baseball) (1967–2022), American baseball player

See also
Charles Carr (disambiguation)